Paul Louis Roach (born October 24, 1927) is a former American football player, coach, and college athletics administrator. He served as the head football coach at the University of Wyoming from 1987 to 1990. While there, he compiled a 35–15 record, had a .700 winning percentage, highest in school history, and two seasons of ten or more wins (1987–1988). During that time he also served as the school's athletic director, and won two Western Athletic Conference championships. In both those years, he won WAC Coach of the Year honors, and was a two-time finalist for National Coach of the Year.

Roach also worked as an assistant coach in the National Football League (NFL) with the Denver Broncos, Green Bay Packers, and Oakland Raiders.  He graduated from Black Hills Teacher's College (now Black Hills State University) in 1952.

Head coaching record

College

References

1927 births
Possibly living people
Black Hills State Yellow Jackets football players
Denver Broncos coaches
Green Bay Packers coaches
North Dakota State Bison football coaches
Oakland Raiders coaches
High school football coaches in North Dakota
People from Spring Green, Wisconsin
Wisconsin Badgers football coaches
Wyoming Cowboys and Cowgirls athletic directors
Wyoming Cowboys football coaches